Erich "Ete" Beer (born 9 December 1946) is a German former football player and coach.

Career 
Beer was born in Neustadt bei Coburg. He started his career at SpVgg Ebing and played until 1968 with VfL Neustadt, until a move to the Bundesliga saw him play for 1. FC Nürnberg, Rot-Weiss Essen and Hertha BSC. For these teams he played in Midfield in a total of 342 games, scoring 95 goals. After playing for Ittihad Jeddah, Beer moved to TSV 1860 Munich in 1981, where he played until 1982.

Between 1975 and 1978 he played in 24 games for the West Germany national team, scoring seven goals.

Beer was referred to by reporters as "The Berliner Beer", but was better known by fans as "Ete". Today he lives in Munich.

References

External links 
 
 

1946 births
Living people
People from Coburg (district)
Sportspeople from Upper Franconia
German footballers
Footballers from Bavaria
Association football midfielders
Germany international footballers
Germany B international footballers
Germany under-21 international footballers
UEFA Euro 1976 players
1978 FIFA World Cup players
Bundesliga players
2. Bundesliga players
Saudi Professional League players
1. FC Nürnberg players
Hertha BSC players
Rot-Weiss Essen players
TSV 1860 Munich players
Ittihad FC players
German football managers
TSV 1860 Munich managers
German expatriate footballers
German expatriate sportspeople in Saudi Arabia
Expatriate footballers in Saudi Arabia